Forman Mills, Inc. is a Pennsauken, New Jersey-based retail chain and department store with 44  stores. They also operate a store at the Iverson Mall in Hillcrest Heights, Maryland. It was begun by Richard Forman when he started selling items at the Columbus Farmers Market. The chain is known for their low-priced clothing such as shirts, pants, shorts, capri pants, and hats.

The chain was sold to Goode Partners L.L.C., a New York investment group, in October 2016.

References

External links

Pennsauken Township, New Jersey
Companies based in Camden County, New Jersey
Retail companies established in 1981